Final results for the Boxing competition at the 1948 Summer Olympics.

Medal summary

Medal table

References

 
1948 Summer Olympics events
1948
1948 in boxing
International boxing competitions hosted by the United Kingdom